Daniel Pinchbeck is an American author and conspiracy theorist. His books include Breaking Open the Head: A Psychedelic Journey into the Heart of Contemporary Shamanism, 2012: The Return of Quetzalcoatl , and Notes from the Edge Times. He is a co-founder of the web magazine Reality Sandwich and of the website  Evolver.net, and edited the North Atlantic Books publishing imprint Evolver Editions. He was featured in the 2010 documentary 2012: Time for Change, directed by Joao Amorim and produced by Mangusta Films. He is the founder of the think tank Center for Planetary Culture, which produced the Regenerative Society Wiki.

Family and background
Pinchbeck’s father, Peter Pinchbeck, was an abstract painter, and his mother,  writer and editor Joyce Johnson, was a member of the Beat Generation who dated Jack Kerouac as On the Road at the time was published in 1957 (chronicled in Johnson's book, Minor Characters).

Works and activities
Pinchbeck was a founder of the 1990s literary magazine Open City with fellow writers Thomas Beller and Robert Bingham. He has written for many publications, including Esquire, The New York Times Magazine, The Village Voice, and Rolling Stone. In 1994 he was chosen by The New York Times Magazine as one of "Thirty Under Thirty" destined to change our culture through his work with Open City. He has been a regular columnist for a number of magazines, including Dazed & Confused.

In Breaking Open the Head, Pinchbeck explored shamanism via ceremonies with tribal groups such as the Bwiti of Gabon, who eat iboga, and the Secoya people in the Ecuadorean Amazon, who take the psychedelic tryptamine brew ayahuasca in their ceremonies. He also attended the Burning Man festival in Nevada, and looked at use of psychedelic substances in a de-sacralized modern context. Philosophically influenced by the work of anthroposophist Rudolf Steiner, through his direct experience and research Pinchbeck developed the hypothesis that shamanic and mystical views of reality have validity, and that the modern world had forfeited an understanding of intuitive aspects of being in its pursuit of rational materialism.

Drawing heavily, and somewhat controversially, from material shared on the Breaking Open the Head forums, Pinchbeck's second volume, 2012: The Return of Quetzalcoatl, chronicles Mayan and Hopi prophecies, and follows Pinchbeck's travels and travails as he responds to leads, both physical and intellectual, he receives via this forum. Examining the nature of prophecy during this period, Pinchbeck investigates the New Age hypothesis of Terence McKenna that humanity is experiencing an accelerated process of global consciousness transformation, leading to a new understanding of time and space. The book details the psi or extra-sensory perception research of Dean Radin, the theories of Terence McKenna, the phenomena of crop circles, and a visit to calendar reform advocate José Argüelles. Pinchbeck concludes with an account of receiving a transmission of prophetic material from the Mesoamerican deity Quetzalcoatl,. This claim was enough to get the book dropped by its planned publisher, delaying its release for the greater part of a year. While acknowledging that the validity of such an experience is unknown, Pinchbeck describes how a voice identifying itself as Quetzalcoatl began speaking to him during a 2004 trip to the Amazon. At the time, he was participating in the ceremonies of Santo Daime, a Brazilian religion that includes sacramental use of ayahuasca. Through its references to 2012 and the Maya calendar in the context of New Age beliefs, Pinchbeck's book has contributed to Mayanism.

In May 2007, Pinchbeck launched Reality Sandwich. He is the executive producer of Postmodern Times, a series of web videos presented on the iClips Network, and co-founder of Evolver.net, an online social network. His life and work are featured in the documentary 2012: Time for Change, featuring interviews with Sting, David Lynch, Barbara Marx Hubbard, and others.

In August 2013, Pinchbeck became the host of Mind Shift, a new talk show, filmed in New York City, produced by Gaiam TV.

Pinchbeck's How Soon Is Now? (2017) explores the idea that the ecological crisis is a rite of passage or initiation for humanity collectively, forcing us to reach the next level of our consciousness as a species. The book outlines the changes to our technical infrastructure - agriculture, energy, industry - and our social, political, and economic system that Pinchbeck believes necessary to avoid the worst consequences of global warming and species extinction.

On October 22, 2017, Pinchbeck published a lengthy essay on Facebook that responded to accusations that he is a sexual predator that emerged through the #metoo movement. Pinchbeck conceded to many of the things he was accused of and sought to explain them in terms of his childhood traumas.

Appearances and interviews
In a 1973 article about the Wacky Packs parodies of consumer packaging, seven-year-old Pinchbeck told a reporter for New York Magazine, "I think they're bringing out the truth about foods."

On 14 December 2006, Pinchbeck appeared on the television program The Colbert Report to discuss his book, 2012: The Return of Quetzalcoatl.

Pinchbeck was featured in the 2006 video Entheogen: Awakening the Divine Within, a documentary about rediscovering an enchanted cosmos in the modern world.

Pinchbeck was also featured in the 2008 video 2012: Science or Superstition, a documentary describing how much of what we are hearing is science and how much is superstition.

He interviewed Alejandro Jodorowsky for the German/French art television network Arte in a very personal discussion, spending a night together in France, continuing the interview in different locations like in a park and in a hotel.

Pinchbeck appears in the documentary film 2012: Time for Change, directed by João G. Amorim, which was released in October 2010.
He also appeared in the documentary film Electronic Awakening, directed by AC Johner, released in 2011.

Pinchbeck appeared on The Joe Rogan Experience podcast, recorded on 8 September 2011.

Books and publications

References

External links

1966 births
Living people
Wesleyan University alumni
American male journalists
New Age writers
American spiritual writers
Jewish American writers
American psychedelic drug advocates
Psychedelic drug researchers
2012 phenomenon believers
Nautilus Book Award winners
21st-century American Jews

fr:Hamilton Morris